Červený Újezd is name of several locations in the Czech Republic:
Červený Újezd (Benešov District)
Červený Újezd (Prague-West District)